"Coffin" is a song by Canadian singer-songwriter Jessie Reyez featuring American rapper Eminem released from her debut full-length studio album Before Love Came to Kill Us on March 27, 2020 via FMLY/Island Records. Written by the artists alongside producers Bizness Boi and Tobias Frelin (with additional production credits going to Eminem) , the song has managed to chart in Canada despite not being a single.

It is the second time the singer-songwriter has teamed up with Eminem after she appeared on his 2018 album Kamikaze on the tracks "Good Guy" and "Nice Guy". Em and Reyez sing about another complicated relationship.

Personnel
Jessie Reyez – main artist, vocals, songwriter
Marshall Mathers – featured artist, vocals, additional producer, songwriter
Tobias "Priest" Frelin – bass guitar, producer, songwriter
Andre Robertson – programming, producer, songwriter
Luis Resto – additional keyboards
Joe Strange – recording
Karl Wingate – recording
Mike Strange – recording
Spencer "Moose" Muscio – recording
Tony Campana – recording
Riley Bell – mixing
Mike Bozzi – mastering

Charts

Certifications

References

2020 songs
Eminem songs
Jessie Reyez songs
Songs written by Eminem
Songs written by Jessie Reyez